Li Xiaohong may refer to:

 Li Xiaohong (engineer) (born 1959), Chinese engineer and educator
 Li Xiaohong (athlete) (born 1995), Chinese triple jumper